The 1996 World Doubles Cup was a tennis tournament played on outdoor clay courts at the Craiglockhart Tennis Centre in Edinburgh in Scotland that was part of the 1996 WTA Tour. The tournament was held from 22 to 25 May 1996.

Winners

Women's doubles

 Nicole Arendt /  Manon Bollegraf defeated  Gigi Fernández /  Natasha Zvereva 6–3, 2–6, 7–6
 It was Arendt's 1st title of the year and the 5th of her career. It was Bollegraf's 2nd title of the year and the 23rd of her career.

World Doubles Cup
WTA Doubles Championships
World Doubles Cup
World Doubles Cup